Renocera pallida is a species of fly in the family Sciomyzidae. It is found in the  Palearctic The larvae are predators of Sphaeriidae

References

External links
Images representing Renocera pallida  at BOLD

Sciomyzidae
Insects described in 1820
Muscomorph flies of Europe